Gabriel's Gully is a locality in Otago, New Zealand, three kilometres from Lawrence township and close to the Tuapeka River. It was the site of New Zealand's first major gold rush.

The discovery of gold at Gabriel's Gully by Gabriel Read on 25 May 1861 led to the Central Otago goldrush. While gold had been found in Otago before, this rush was beyond expectation, with the population of the gold field rising from almost nothing to around 11,500 within a year, twice that of Dunedin at the time. It also stimulated overseas interest in the new colony.

In May 1911, the jubilee of the discovery of gold in Gabriel's Gully was held in Lawrence, with around 2,000 people attending, including surviving miners.

Gabriel's Gully today is now part of the Gabriels Gully Historic Reserve, and is managed by the Department of Conservation. It has a Heritage New Zealand Category 1 designation.

References

Further reading
 
McCraw, Ernie (2011). Gabriel Read of Gabriel's Gully. Tuapeka Goldfields Museum Society. viii, 152 p.  A comprehensive history of Gabriel's Gully and Gabriel Read

External links 

 Gabriels Gully Historic Reserve

Populated places in Otago
History of Otago
Otago Gold Rush
Clutha District
Lawrence, New Zealand